Andrew Gimson  (born 1958) is a British political journalist. Gimson formerly wrote the parliamentary sketch for The Daily Telegraph and has written a novel entitled The Desired Effect, as well as books about Boris Johnson, British monarchs and British Prime Ministers.

In November 2011 he was succeeded as sketch writer on The Daily Telegraph by Michael Deacon. Gimson is a former pupil of Uppingham School where he attended West Bank House. He briefly worked in the Conservative Research Department in 1983 before starting his journalism career at The Spectator, commentating on public affairs.

He is married to Sally Gimson (formerly Sally Malcolm-Smith), who stood in the South Leicestershire constituency as an unsuccessful candidate for the Labour Party in the May 2010 general election.

Books
The Desired Effect (1991)
Boris: The Rise of Boris Johnson (2006)
 Gimson's Kings and Queens: Brief Lives of the Forty Monarchs since 1066 (2015)
Gimson's Prime Ministers: Brief Lives from Walpole to May (2018), illustrated by Martin Rowson
Gimson's Presidents: Brief Lives from Washington to Trump (2020), illustrated by Martin Rowson

References

External links
Journalisted - Articles by Andrew Gimson

British male journalists
Living people
1958 births
Conservative Party (UK) officials